Downtown Amman (al-Balad) is an old, central commercial area of Amman, Jordan.

History
The Balad is the oldest section of the city. It is believed to have first been inhabited during the Neolithic period (around 6500 B.C.). The seven jabals (hills) around it were occupied during the same time and formed the perimeter of the young city. The Amman Citadel sits atop Citadel Hill.

Markets in the Balad were trafficked by Ammanis of all stripes throughout most of the 20th century. This later changed; the area's commercial activity began to be referred to as "popular markets," connoting a perceived demographic shift in the kinds of people frequenting the markets. By the late 1960s and early 70s, the Balad was a topic of public debate, especially regarding public and private transportation options. Historically, the Balad's crossroads of public and shared transit routes (busses and shared cabs called "service") connected areas outside of central Amman with downtown and its neighboring hills, such as Jabal Weibdeh, Jabal Amman, Jabal Ashrafiyeh, and others. Various development projects were initiated by public and private actors which dramatically changed the character of the neighborhood in recent decades, even resulting in a general "decline in human presence" by the 2000s compared to previous eras.

Sites
Downtown Amman is made up of a myriad of souq markets and independently-owned businesses, including informal and marginalized economies. As described by anthropologist Ahmad Abu Khalil:"...within the area there is a concentration of the oldest central markets for vegetables, clothes, and secondhand clothes. The area is a core place for the informal commercial and service sector, via hundreds of street vendors (thousands during the peak time) and a specialized market for the Asian migrant workforce, especially on Friday. This is because it contains much of the secondhand business in Amman, especially that of the furniture sector."The Al Husseini Mosque is a major local landmark and can be said to divide the Balad into two (West and East). 

The area's long history, having been built up over ancient ruins, leaves a large number of historical sites, such as the nearby Amman Citadel with the Umayyad Palace, the Hashemite Plaza with the Roman Theatre and the Odeon, and the Roman Nymphaeum. New archaeological excavations are ongoing in 2020. Scholars reason that part of the draw to this location in ancient times was likely the proximity to the now mostly-dry Amman River.

See also
Jabal Amman
Ras Al-Ein
The Roman Amphitheater
Citadel Hill, Amman

References

Amman